Mary Alexandra Earps (born 7 March 1993) is an English professional footballer who plays as a goalkeeper for Manchester United in the Women's Super League and the England national team.

She previously played for FA WSL clubs Bristol Academy, Birmingham City, Doncaster Belles, and Reading, and in the Bundesliga with VfL Wolfsburg. Earps has represented England at under-17, under-19, and under-23 levels, and won her first senior cap in 2017.

Club career
In 2009–10 Earps was promoted to Leicester City's first team squad from the centre of excellence, to provide competition for regular goalkeeper Leanne Hall. The following season Earps signed for Nottingham Forest. She was an unused substitute in Forest's penalty shootout defeat by Barnet in the FA Women's Premier League Cup final.

Doncaster Rovers Belles signed 18-year-old Earps immediately before the start of the inaugural 2011 season of the FA WSL. Belles manager John Buckley was pleased to secure her services: "She has outstanding potential and a very bright future ahead of her." Earps began to play regularly in the second part of the 2011 season, then joined Coventry City on loan during the off-season.

After spending the 2012 season with Doncaster, Earps joined Birmingham City ahead of 2013. In November 2013 she made her UEFA Women's Champions League debut in a 5–2 win over FC Zorky, staged at St Andrew's. The presence of Rebecca Spencer limited Earps's playing time at Birmingham, so she joined Bristol Academy for 2014.

At Bristol Earps played in all but one of the team's matches through the 2014 and 2015 seasons.

When Bristol were relegated at the end of her second season, Earps left to join Reading. In her first season with Reading, Earps won PFA Team of the Year honours.

In June 2018, Earps joined defending Bundesliga champions VfL Wolfsburg. She made her debut on 8 September 2018 in a 11–0 win over Hannover 96 in the DFB-Pokal second round. The team won their third consecutive domestic double during the 2018–19 season.

On 12 July 2019, after one season in Germany, Earps returned to England to sign for newly promoted Manchester United ahead of the 2019–20 season. Earps made her debut for Manchester United against Manchester City in the FA WSL on 7 September 2019, a 1–0 loss in the inaugural Manchester derby. She kept her first clean sheet for the club on 28 September 2019 in a 2–0 win over Liverpool, the club's first FA WSL victory. On 26 February 2021, Earps signed a new deal with Manchester United until 2023 with the option of a further year.

International career
Earps played for England under-19 at the 2012 UEFA Women's Under-19 Championship in Antalya, Turkey. She won praise for her performances despite England's group stage exit. In July 2013, Loughborough University student Earps helped Great Britain to a gold medal in the 2013 Summer Universiade in Kazan, Russia.
Following injuries to Karen Bardsley and Rachel Brown-Finnis, England's senior national team gave Earps her first call up for an April 2014 FIFA Women's World Cup qualification match against Montenegro at the Falmer Stadium, Brighton and Hove. She returned to the senior squad in September 2015 for England's 8–0 UEFA Women's Euro 2017 qualifying win in Estonia.

In June 2017, Earps was called up to England's training camp for UEFA Women's Euro 2017 as a fourth-choice goalkeeper. On 11 June 2017 she won her first senior cap in a 4–0 friendly win over Switzerland in Biel.

On 8 May 2019 she was named in the squad for the 2019 FIFA Women's World Cup.

On 17 September 2021, Earps was named as the starting goalkeeper in Sarina Wiegman's first game as England manager, her first Lionesses appearance since November 2019. England beat North Macedonia 8–0 as part of 2023 World Cup qualifying. Having remained as Wiegman's first choice goalkeeper starting in eight of her first 11 matches, Earps was included in the England squad for UEFA Women's Euro 2022 in June 2022. She played every minute of all six games during the campaign as England won the Euros for the first time. Earps conceded twice, keeping four clean sheets, the joint-most tied with fellow finalist Merle Frohms of Germany and was named to the Team of the Tournament.

Personal life
Between 2012 and 2016, Earps earned a degree in Information Management and Business Studies from Loughborough University.

Career statistics

Club

International
Statistics accurate as of match played 22 February 2023.

Honours
VfL Wolfsburg
Frauen-Bundesliga: 2018–19
DFB-Pokal: 2018–19

England

UEFA Women's Championship: 2022
SheBelieves Cup: 2019
Arnold Clark Cup: 2022, 2023

Individual
 The Best FIFA Women's Goalkeeper: 2022
FA WSL Team of the Year: 2016–17
UEFA Women's Championship Team of the Tournament: 2022
Freedom of the City of London (announced 1 August 2022)

See also
 List of England women's international footballers
 List of Manchester United W.F.C. players
 FA WSL records and statistics
 List of people from Nottingham

References

External links

 Profile at the Manchester United F.C. website
 Profile at the Football Association website
 
 
 

Living people
1993 births
Footballers from Nottingham
English women's footballers
Women's association football goalkeepers
Alumni of Loughborough University
Leicester City W.F.C. players
Nottingham Forest Women F.C. players
Doncaster Rovers Belles L.F.C. players
Coventry United W.F.C. players
Birmingham City W.F.C. players
Bristol City W.F.C. players
Reading F.C. Women players
VfL Wolfsburg (women) players
Frauen-Bundesliga players
Manchester United W.F.C. players
FA Women's National League players
Women's Super League players
2. Frauen-Bundesliga players
Frauen-Bundesliga players
England women's under-23 international footballers
England women's international footballers
2019 FIFA Women's World Cup players
Universiade gold medalists for Great Britain
Universiade medalists in football
English expatriate women's footballers
English expatriate sportspeople in Germany
Expatriate women's footballers in Germany
Medalists at the 2013 Summer Universiade
UEFA Women's Euro 2022 players
UEFA Women's Championship-winning players